Blues Shout is an album by saxophonist Leo Wright featuring performances recorded in 1960 for the Atlantic label.

Reception

AllMusic reviewer Jason Ankeney stated: "Wright divides his attention between his signature alto sax and flute, delivering a series of thoughtful and lyrical solos that positively radiate energy. The blues referenced in the title are more a feeling than a sound, underscoring the emotional intensity that bristles below the surface of every note".

Track listing
All compositions by Leo Wright, except as indicated
 "Sigi" - 3:23
 "Angel Eyes" (Matt Dennis, Earl Brent) - 5:08
 "Autumn Leaves" (Joseph Kosma, Jacques Prévert, Johnny Mercer) - 3:45
 "Indian Summer" (Victor Herbert, Al Dubin) - 7:00  
 "Blues Shout" (Gigi Gryce) - 4:56
 "A Night in Tunisia" (Dizzy Gillespie, Frank Paparelli) - 5:19
 "The Wind" (Russ Freeman, Jerry Gladstone) - 4:38
 "Two Moods" - 5:48

Personnel 
Leo Wright - alto saxophone, flute
Richard Williams - trumpet (tracks 5–8)  
Harry Lookofsky - violin (tracks 1–4)
Junior Mance - piano
Art Davis - bass
Charlie Persip - drums

References 

1960 albums
Leo Wright albums
Atlantic Records albums
Albums produced by Nesuhi Ertegun